Rütli or Grütli is a mountain meadow on Lake Lucerne, in the Seelisberg municipality of the Swiss canton of Uri. 
It is the site of the  Rütlischwur in traditional Swiss historiography, the oath marking the foundation of the original Swiss Confederacy.
As such it is treated as a  national monument of  Switzerland. Since 1860, the Schweizerische Gemeinnützige Gesellschaft (SGG) has organized a celebration at the site 
on  Swiss National Day (1 August), since 1994 recognized as a public holiday.

History

The Rütli became a site of symbolic importance for Swiss national identity in the early 18th century, with incipient National Romanticism.
In the 1780s, there were (unsuccessful) proposals to erect a monument to Liberty at the site.
Under the Helvetic Republic, the Rütli became a site of pilgrimage for conservative dissidents. In 1804, the year after the dissolution of the Helvetic Republic, Friedrich Schiller published his Willam Tell, which dramatized the Rütli oath. A patriotic Rütlilied was written by Johann Krauer and Franz Joseph Greith in 1820.

In 1859, the Rütli meadow was bought by the Schweizerische Gemeinnützige Gesellschaft (SGG, "Swiss society for public utility, founded 1810)  with the aim of preserving it as a site of national importance, among other reasons because there were plans to build a hotel at the site. The SGG turned ownership of the site over to the Confederacy under the condition of treating it as an unalienable national property and leaving its administration entrusted to the SGG.

On July 25, 1940, General Henri Guisan used the site for his speech, now remembered as the "Rütlirapport", to all commanding officers of the Swiss Armed Forces in which he outlined the Reduit strategy and his aim never to surrender if invaded (see Switzerland during the World Wars):
"I decided to reunite you in this historic place, the symbolic ground of our independence, to explain the urgency of the situation, and to speak of you as a soldier to soldiers. We are at a turning point of our history. The survival of Switzerland is at stake."

Since 1991, Rütli has also been the start of the Swiss Path hiking trail created to celebrate the 700th anniversary of Switzerland.

The National Day celebrations at the Rütli were disrupted by  Neo-Nazis in 2005. In reaction to this, access to the celebration was subject to pre-registration the following year.
In apparent connection to this controversy, an individual caused a detonation at the 2007 celebration. The "attacker" was dubbed "Rütli-Bomber" in the popular press and spent a year in  custody and while being investigated by   federal police.  It turned out that the "bomb" consisted of legal fireworks buried in the meadow at a depth of 20 cm.  The case was closed without charges being filed in 2011.

See also
Rütlischwur
Federal Charter of 1291
Swiss patriotism

References

External links

 Rütli Commission website (English/French/German/Italian)
 https://www.sgg-ssup.ch/en/ruetli-en.html

Geography of Switzerland
Geography of the canton of Uri
Monuments and memorials in Switzerland
Tourist attractions in the canton of Uri